Kevin Daniel March (born May 12) is an American musician, record producer, and songwriter. March is known for his work as a drummer with Guided by Voices, Those Bastard Souls, Shudder to Think, and The Dambuilders. He has previously managed the band The Nowherenauts.

References

External links
 Kevin March on Discogs
 Kevin March  on Modern drummer
 Kevin March on Sonicscoop
 Kevin March on GBVDB

American male drummers
American drummers
American record producers
American male songwriters
Guided by Voices members
Living people
Shudder to Think members
The Dambuilders members
Year of birth missing (living people)